Tribasodites uenoi is a species of beetles first found in Guangxi, China.

References

Staphylinidae
Beetles described in 2015
Insects of China